Jack Butler  (born 1868) was a Welsh international footballer. He was part of the Wales national football team, playing 3 matches and scoring a total of 764 goals. He played his first match on 13 March 1893 against England and his last match on 5 April 1893 against Ireland.

See also
 List of Wales international footballers (alphabetical)

References

1868 births
1956 deaths
Welsh footballers
Wales international footballers
Association football forwards
Place of birth missing
Date of death missing
Chirk AAA F.C. players